Saura painting is a style of wall mural paintings associated with the Saura tribals of the state of Odisha in India.  These paintings, also called ikons (or ekons) are visually similar to Warli paintings and hold religious significance for the Sauras.

The Saura tribe 

Sauras are among the most ancient of tribes in India and find mention in the Hindu epics of Ramayana and Mahabharata. Savari, Rama's devotee in the Ramayana and Jara, the hunter who mortally wounded Krishna with an arrow, are thought to have been members of this tribe. Lord Krishna's body is believed to have flowed into the sea near Puri as a wooden log and the idol Jagannath at Puri is believed to have been sculpted from it. Saura paintings are an integral part of the religious ceremonies of the Saura tribals and are found in the southern Odisha districts of Rayagada, Ganjam, Gajapati and Koraput. Saura paintings were first studied by the famous anthropologist Verrier Elwin.

Paintings 
The Saura wall paintings are called Italons or Ikons (or Ekons) and are dedicated to Idital (also Edital) the main deity of the Sauras. These paintings draw upon tribal folklore and have ritualistic importance. Ikons make extensive use of symbolically pregnant icons that mirror the quotidian chores of the Sauras. People, horses, elephants, the sun and the moon and the tree of life are recurring motifs in these ikons. Ikons were originally painted on the walls of the Saura's adobe huts. The paintings' backdrop is prepared from red or yellow ochre earth which is then painted over using brushes fashioned from tender bamboo shoots. Ekons use natural dyes and chromes derived from ground white stone, hued earth, and vermilion and mixtures of tamarind seed, flower and leaf extracts.

Ikons are worshipped during special religious and cultural occasions such as child-birth, harvest, marriage and the construction of a new house. Ikons are not commissioned frequently and an existing one can be regularly used for mundane rituals. The building of a new dwelling however necessitates the commissioning of an ekon, which is painted in a dark corner inside the home where its creation is accompanied by the recital of a specific set of prayers. Traditionally, Kudangs, the priestly class among the Sauras, painted the ikons since they also had the expertise to explain the symbolic import of the images contained therein to the villagers. Thus the ikons also became a part of the aural tradition of the Sauras that linked them to their traditions and customs. Today the Kudangs have been supplanted by artists and paintings are often executed in non-traditional locales.

Comparison with Warli paintings 

Saura paintings have a striking visual semblance to Warli art and both use clear geometric frames for their construction but they differ in both their style and treatment of subjects. In Saura paintings, a fish-net approach - of painting from the border inwards - is used while this not the case with Warli paintings. Although both are examples of tribal pictographs that employ stick figures, Warli paintings use conjoint triangles to depict the human body while the figures are not as sharply delineated in Saura paintings. Also, unlike the Warli paintings where male and female icons are clearly distinguishable, in Saura art there is no such physical differentiation.

Saura paintings today 
Their diversity, detail and unique style have given ikons an 'in-vogue-appeal' and increasing popularity in recent years. The influence of markets and increasing awareness about the other's forms have led to both Saura and Warli paintings picking up details of technique and style from the other. They have also been popularised in recent times as an avenue for skill and job creation and have increasingly been used to decorate items like T-shirts, greeting cards, stationery and items of clothing.
Saura pattachitra now becoming popular along with its mural painting.

References

Further reading
 (see index: p. 138-142)

Odia culture
Tribal art
Murals in India
Schools of Indian painting